Sunsets and Glories is a play by noted playwright and Academy Award-nominated screenwriter Peter Barnes.  The play is based on the brief reign of Pope Celestine V.

First directed by Stuart Burge who had directed Barnes' Ruling Class at the Nottingham Playhouse 22 years earlier, and starring Freddie Jones as Pope Celestine V and Marius Goring as Cardinal Latino Malabranca Orsini, Sunsets and Glories premiered at the 1990 opening of the new West Yorkshire Playhouse on the Quarry Hill site, Leeds.

1990 plays
British plays
Plays set in Italy
Plays set in the 13th century
Biographical plays about religious leaders
Cultural depictions of religious leaders
Popes in art